Jingnan, also known as Nanping (南平; alternatively written as Southern Ping) and Northern Chu in historiography, was a dynastic state of China and one of the Ten Kingdoms during the Five Dynasties and Ten Kingdoms period. Lasting from 924 to 963, it was located in south-central China.

Rulers

Rulers family tree

References

 
History of Fujian
Five Dynasties and Ten Kingdoms
Former countries in Chinese history
10th century in China
924 establishments
10th-century establishments in China
963 disestablishments
10th-century disestablishments in China
Former monarchies of East Asia